Robert Charles Bastard (4 February 1863 – 6 November 1941) was an Australian swimming teacher who succeeded his father Thomas Barnabas Bastard as lessee of Adelaide's "City Baths". When the council upgraded the facility to include the city's only Olympic-size swimming pool, Bastard was retained as a supervisor.

History

Bastard's parents, Thomas Barnabas Bastard (died 10 September 1883) and Elizabeth Lucy Bastard (c 1821 – 23 August 1877) immigrated to South Australia by the William Stuart in 1852, and in later years would found the Old Colonists' Association. Also on board was their son John Bastard (22 October 1843 – 17 June 1908), who would become posts and telegraph master at Port Adelaide, and several other children, including one born on voyage.

His father, a bootmaker by trade, had been taught to swim by Captain Beckwith, father of Fred Beckwith (1821–1898), and applied his knowledge in teaching other colonists at what passed in those days for a bathing pool — a fenced-off section of the River Torrens, upstream from what is now the Morphett Street bridge.
The original City Baths (1863–1913), on King William Road below Parliament House, was erected by the Adelaide City Council, and its first manager ("Keeper of the Baths") was a council employee, John Cox, previously Overseer of Works, as no tenders were received for its lease due to the cost of water. After a three year delay a seven-year lease of the property was put up for tender, and Thomas Bastard was the successful applicant, and renewed it another two times before he died.
It was open to men and boys only; no bathers were worn, and admission was 3d. (three pence, perhaps $2 in today's values). It was rebuilt in 1883 and reopened a few months after Thomas Bastard's death. Bastard was universally honored for his devotion to teaching. The Baths had a major makeover in 1910, with viewing platforms and showers installed and walls tiled. Women had been admitted for years, but until Annette Kellerman made bathing fashionable there were few female patrons.
That was, in turn, replaced in 1940, built to Olympic standards, with a separate diving pool and tiered stands for spectators. The City Baths was totally demolished in 1972 to make way for the Festival Centre.
Charles Bastard first came to public notice in 1869, when he was already a strong swimmer in various styles, and to amuse patrons of the Baths would perform aquatic feats such as retrieving a shilling coin thrown into the deepest part of the pool.
On the death of their father, Charles and his brother Philip Stewart Bastard (1853– ) inherited the lease, and in 1885 Charles bought out his brother (a champion swimmer who from 1877 had managed the Baths for his father but in 1880 left for New Zealand) and was later in Denver City, Colorado, where he had the misfortune to be mistaken for a wanted criminal and arrested.

In February 1863 Thomas Bastard made a failed attempt to form a swimming club, but was more successful a year later, electing to serve as hon. Treasurer of the South Australian Swimming Club, which he filled with conspicuous success until his death in 1883, while J. Kemp Penney took the role of Secretary. Anthony Forster, MLC, whose son Anthony Yarwood Forster (1849–1874) was a fine swimmer, was offered the post of President. Thomas
Charles Bastard acted as Secretary 1881 to 1909.

In May 1887 he converted the pool to a (roller) skating rink for the colder months when patronage by swimmers was at a minimum.

In 1888 Bastard took over management of the Columbia Rink in Calcutta for the firm of Ridgley & Raymond, leaving longtime employee Fred Needham in charge.

Bastard was appointed caretaker and foreman of the new Baths. He died at the Wakefield Street hospital and his remains interred with those of his mother, at the West Terrace Cemetery.

Personal
Bastard was a non-smoker and teetotal. He ate sparingly, of simple foods. Every morning he exercised for ten minutes with dumbbells then took a swimming class before breakfast.

Recognition
A plaque reading  was installed at the City Baths shortly after his death.

Family
Thomas Barnabas Bastard ( – 10 September 1883) married Elizabeth Lucy ?? (c 1821 – 23 August 1877). Their children include:
Elizabeth Lucy Bastard (1841 – 5 February 1919) married O'Shannon
John Bastard (22 October 1843 – 17 June 1908) married Elizabeth Dench on 24 May 1864. Their grandson Frederick John Bastard changed his surname to Baxter.
Mary Ann Bastard (11 September 1845 – 14 August 1930)
Martha Bastard (15 July 1847 – 5 June 1926) married Henry Langberg in 1871
Thomas George Bastard (March 1850 – 14 December 1918)

Philip Stewart Bastard (4 June 1853 – 7 November 1920)

Robert Charles Bastard (4 February 1863 – 6 November 1941)
Frederick Charles Bastard (24 December 1884 – )
Ethel Emily Bastard (20 June 1887 – )
Winnifred Isabel Bastard (1890– )
Stanley Robert Bastard (1892– )

Emma Bastard (10 August 1867 – 25 February 1948) married Albert Edward Eardley in 1888

Notes and references 

Australian swimming coaches
1863 births
1941 deaths